Tom Briggs may refer to:

Tom Briggs (footballer) (1919–1999), English footballer
Tommy Briggs (1923–1984), English footballer
Tom Briggs (gridiron football) (born 1970), American football player
Tom Briggs (rugby league), Australian rugby league player

See also
 Thomas Briggs (disambiguation)